Arnot is a ghost town located in Adams County, Mississippi, United States.

Arnot was located on the Mississippi River, on the border with Louisiana. It had a post office from 1886 to 1921. In 1900, Arnot had a population of 51.

Arnot is located on a barren peninsula called Jackson Point.  South of the community is the Arnot Oil Field.

References

Former populated places in Adams County, Mississippi
Mississippi populated places on the Mississippi River
Former populated places in Mississippi